In Old Kentucky is a 1927 American silent drama film produced and distributed by Metro-Goldwyn-Mayer and directed by John M. Stahl.  The film was based on the popular 1893 play of the same name by Charles T. Dazey and stars Helene Costello and James Murray. In Old Kentucky also features an early performance by Lincoln Perry, who later became known as Stepin Fetchit. The performance proved to be a breakthrough for Perry who signed a five-year contract with Fox Film Corporation shortly after the film's release.

The film is a remake of the 1919 film of the same name which was M-G-M studio head Louis B. Mayer's first production as an independent producer. The play was adapted for the screen a third time in 1935 starring Will Rogers in one of his final film appearances.

Cast
James Murray as Jimmy Brierly
Helene Costello as Nancy Holden
Wesley Barry as Skippy Lowry
Dorothy Cumming as Mrs. Brierly
Edward Martindel as Mr. Brierly
Harvey Clark as Dan Lowry
Stepin Fetchit as Highpockets
Carolynne Snowden as Lily May
Nick Cogley as Uncle Bible
Dean Harrell (uncredited)
Mildred Washington (uncredited)

References

External links

Lobby poster

1927 films
1927 drama films
Silent American drama films
American silent feature films
American black-and-white films
American films based on plays
Films directed by John M. Stahl
Remakes of American films
Films set in Kentucky
Metro-Goldwyn-Mayer films
1920s American films